N-Methyl-2-thiazolidinethione is the organosulfur compound with the formula C2H4S(NCH3)CS.  It is classified as a heterocycle called a thiazolidine.  It is a colorless or off-white solid.  It has gained attention as a proposed low toxicity replacement for ethylenethioureas, which are used as accelerators for the vulcanization of chloroprene rubbers.  The compound is prepared by reaction of N-methylethanolamine and carbon disulfide.

See also
Mercaptobenzothiazole - a structurally similar, but aromatic, vulcanization accelerator

References

Thiazolidines
Dithiocarbamates